Kim Yong-ae (born 7 March 1983) is a North Korean football forward who played for the North Korea women's national football team. She competed at the 2008 Summer Olympics. At the club level, she played for April 25.

International goals

See also
 North Korea at the 2008 Summer Olympics

References

External links

 

1983 births
Living people
North Korean women's footballers
Place of birth missing (living people)
Footballers at the 2008 Summer Olympics
Olympic footballers of North Korea
Women's association football forwards
Asian Games medalists in football
Footballers at the 2006 Asian Games
Footballers at the 2010 Asian Games
North Korea women's international footballers
2007 FIFA Women's World Cup players
Asian Games gold medalists for North Korea
Asian Games silver medalists for North Korea
Medalists at the 2006 Asian Games
Medalists at the 2010 Asian Games